Michael Scully (born 1964) is an Irish retired hurler who played as a left wing-forward for the Tipperary senior team.

An All-Ireland-winning captain in the under-21 grade, Scully made his first appearance for the senior team during the 1985-86 National League and became a regular member of the team over the next few seasons. During that time he failed to claim any honours at senior level.

At club level Scully played with the Roscrea club.

References

1964 births
Living people
Roscrea hurlers
Tipperary inter-county hurlers
People from County Tipperary